Aedophron sumorita is a species of moth of the family Noctuidae. It is found in Iran.

Heliothinae
Moths of Asia
Moths described in 2002